KIML (1270 AM) is a radio station broadcasting a News Talk Information format. It is licensed to Gillette, Wyoming, United States. The station is currently owned by the Basin Radio Network, a division of Legend Communications of Wyoming, LLC. It features programming from Fox News Radio and Wyoming Cowboys sports.

KIML and its four sister stations, KAML-FM, KGWY, KLED and KDDV, are located at 2810 Southern Drive, Gillette. KIML's transmitter site is north of town, on Hannum Road. The translator for KIML shares the tower with KGWY and KLED near the station's studios.

History
The station went on the air as KIML.

In April 2015, KIML began broadcasting using an FM translator on 106.7 FM. The translator previously carried programming from KQFR in Rapid City, South Dakota. It then began broadcasting on a translator on 107.5 FM.

References

External links

 
 
 
 

IML
News and talk radio stations in the United States
Radio stations established in 1957